Alexander Helenus Johannes Leopoldus Fiévez (22 June 1902, Zutphen – 30 April 1949, The Hague) was a Dutch politician.

References

1902 births
1949 deaths
Catholic People's Party politicians
20th-century Dutch politicians
Dutch Roman Catholics
Ministers of War of the Netherlands
Ministers of the Navy of the Netherlands
Members of the House of Representatives (Netherlands)
Royal Netherlands Army personnel of World War II
Royal Netherlands Army officers
People from Zutphen